Image and Reality of the Israel–Palestine Conflict is a 1995 book about the Israeli–Palestinian conflict by Norman G. Finkelstein. Finkelstein examines and scrutinizes popular historical versions of the conflict by authors such as Joan Peters, Benny Morris, Anita Shapira and Abba Eban. The text draws upon Finkelstein's doctoral political science work. The 2003 revised edition offers an additional appendix devoted to criticism of Michael Oren's 2002 bestseller Six Days of War: June 1967 and the Making of the Modern Middle East.

Finkelstein, expanding upon his doctorate thesis, writes that the modern Zionist historical tradition is based on a series of ideologically-charged systematic biases, all of which face considerable problems when measured up with the actual record in his view. For example, he specifically refers to the Palestinian exodus before Israeli independence and the purported causes. Finkelstein credits Zionist military aggression upon Palestinian villages and calls for a transfer of populations as driving Palestinian refugees out of their lands, rather than a voluntary exodus occurring mixed in with orders to leave from Arabic leaders and other factors as Israeli historians have written.  He goes into detail on issues such as Israel's exploitation of water rights.

His book received praise from authors critical of Israel, and William B. Quandt. Supportive reviews appeared in publications such as Foreign Affairs, The Guardian and the London Review of Books.

Reviews and reception
London Review of Books published a review stating that the book served as "both an impressive analysis of Zionist ideology and a searing but scholarly indictment of Israel's treatment of the Arabs since 1948."

Rita J. Simon from American University gave it a mixed review. The book, she says, is the most comprehensive and the most virulent of a set of books she reviewed; while she says "Finkelstein's arguments... are usually documented with data and scholarly arguments" and "is more than an emotional diatribe against Israel" she criticized it for letting the reader to believe  that "Israelis are the Nazis of the 21st century", a notion that destroys "the scholarly integrity of their work".

William B. Quandt, in a short review in Foreign Affairs, praised the book as "required reading in the continuing war of the historians."

Historian Avi Shlaim remarked that the "book makes a major contribution to the study of the Arab-Israeli conflict which deserves to be widely read, especially in the United States.”

See also

History of Palestine
The Holocaust Industry
Jewish lobby
Criticism of the Israeli government

Footnotes

References
Finkelstein, Norman G. (2003): Image and Reality of the Israel–Palestine Conflict, Verso Books,

External links
Review by Ronald Bleier in Middle East Policy, Volume VII, Number 1 (October 1999). 
Image and Reality of the Israel-Palestine Conflict at Finkelstein's official website.

1995 non-fiction books
Books by Norman Finkelstein
Books critical of Israel
Books critical of Zionism
English-language books
Historiography of Israel
Israeli–Palestinian conflict books
Verso Books books